Nihal Samarasinghe, (Sinhala: නිහල් සමරසිංහ; 1937 – 11 July 2017), popularly known as Sam The Man was a famous Sri Lankan saxophonist and singer, who was considered an icon of the Sri Lanka English music scene. He played the Saxophone for Leonard Franke’s band “The Manhattans" (Sri Lankan", “The Jetliners” in the 1960’s, and also in his own band. He was active as a musician for 6 decades. Nihal was considered by many Sri Lankans as the ‘King’ of the Sing Along, he is said to have introduced the first Sing Along Concert in Sri Lanka in 1997.

References

1937 births
2017 deaths
20th-century Sri Lankan male singers
Sinhalese singers
21st-century Sri Lankan male singers
Alumni of S. Thomas' College, Mount Lavinia
People from British Ceylon
20th-century saxophonists
21st-century saxophonists